The  is a professional golf tournament on the Japan Golf Tour. It has been played annually at The North Country Golf Club near Chitose, Hokkaido since 2005. 

The tournament typically took place during the first week of July, but since 2019 it has been played in late August. The course measures 7,178 yards and the par was 72. In 2019, the purse was ¥150,000,000, with ¥30,000,000 going to the winner.

Shunsuke Sonoda set the tournament record in 2013, shooting −20 (268) a score subsequently equalled by Ryo Ishikawa in 2019.

Winners

Notes

External links
Coverage on the Japan Golf Tour's official site

Japan Golf Tour events
Golf tournaments in Japan
Sport in Hokkaido
Sega Sammy Holdings
Recurring sporting events established in 2005
2005 establishments in Japan